Mahmoud Abouelleil (1935–2011) was Minister of Justice of the Arab Republic of Egypt from July 2004 until his resignation in August 2006. He was governor of Giza from 2000 till 2004, and Kafr-El-Sheikh from 1996 till 2000.

Abouelleil was born in the city of El-Minia, governorate of El-Minia on 24 December 1935 to a father engaged in journalism. He moved to Cairo in the early fifties and after completing his high school education at Al-Ibrahimiyya school, he enrolled in 1954 into the faculty of Law, Cairo University, graduating in 1958. He was appointed assistant to the public prosecutor and along the years ascended the career ladder to the become head of the Cairo Appeal's court and the Cairo and Giza Criminal and National Security court. He was subsequently appointed Chief Justice of the Giza Primary Court from 1992 till 1996.

The Governor Years 1996-2004
During his years as a governor Mahmoud Abouelleil was a keen supporter of projects to improve infrastructure and public services and the development of industrial areas, as well as encouragement of investment opportunities in Kafr-el-Sheikh and Giza. Also notable during this period, was shedding the spotlight on the Bahariya Oasis region. These efforts culminated in the presidential decision to allocate 20,000 feddan for agricultural, industrial and tourism development in accordance with environmental considerations in this promising area.

Minister of Justice 2004-2006
Several important events occurred during Counsellor Mahmoud Abouelleil's years as minister of justice. Presidential elections took place for the first time in the history of Egypt. This occurred in the midst of several changes to the constitution and other fundamental political laws. In particular, the "Judiciary Power Law" which had been demanded by judges for over twenty years, finally saw the light in the form of several amendments in favour of judiciary independence. There was also a modification to the current law that deals with regulation of the media to provide new guarantees for freedom of speech and expression. This was law no. 47, 15 July 2006. 
Counsellor Mahmoud Abouelleil oversaw the parliamentary elections in 2005 by heading the electoral committee in which in the first stage the elections witnessed an unprecedented success of independent candidates. Before the elections Counsellor Mahmoud Abouelleil issued a statement in his capacity as head of the electoral committee guaranteeing that the judiciary observation of the elections would be comprehensive and impartial. This however was not allowed to occur in the second and third stages of the elections which resulted in a crisis forming between the judges group and the state. The judges made their demands clear in terms of independence of the judiciary from the state, and the guarantee of fair and impartial elections. Counsellor Mahmoud Abouelleil sided with the judges and in an historic publication from the ministry of justice he indicated his support of independent judiciary. This was published on June 8, 2005 and was sent to Egypt's highest judiciary board.  
During this time, the ministry continued to support the different judges groups across the country, providing subsidised health care and financial support to the groups in Cairo, Alexandria and surrounding districts. The crisis between the judges group and the state continued, and it cast its shadow over the two years during which Counsellor Mahmoud Abouelleil was in this position. The continuation of the crisis made it difficult for Counsellor Mahmoud Abouelleil to continue his other political and administrative duties. He presented his resignation while indicating his continued vision and support for judiciary independence, and while making clear that his vision is one that cannot be realised in the current climate. His resignation was accepted ten days after it was presented and was followed by the presidential decision to honour him with the Republican Medal of the First Degree, one of Egypt's highest state honours. Counsellor Abouelleil passed away in London on 27 September 2011.

Personal life
Mahmoud Abouelleil married Nadia Abdelaziz in 1968. They had three children and seven grandchildren. He was the father of Mai Abouelleil, Maha Abouelleil, and Mohammed Abouelleil Rashed. His grandchildren are Zeina, Farah, Youssef, Mahmoud, Khadijah, Adele and Ali.

References

External links
 Business Today Magazine - The New Cabinet of Egypt

1935 births
2011 deaths
21st-century Egyptian politicians
People from Minya Governorate
Cairo University alumni
Justice ministers of Egypt
Governors of Kafr El Sheikh